Antonio Vega Tallés (a.k.a. Antonio Vega) (16 December 1957 – 12 May 2009) was a Spanish pop singer-songwriter.

Biography
He was born in Madrid. In a psychologist test he got 168 of intelligence quotient. He studied at the Liceo Francés de Madrid, where he acted for the first time at aged 14.

Antonio Vega has been considered one of the fundamental composers of Spanish pop since the beginning of democracy. The intimacy of his songs and his sensitivity earned him admiration both from public and critics.

He was addicted to drugs since the 80s, which over time ceased to be a secret from the public.

On 20 April 2009 Antonio Vega was admitted to the Hospital Puerta de Hierro in Madrid with severe pneumonia that forced him to suspend his tour. 51-year old died on 12 May 2009, as a result of lung cancer that had been diagnosed 10 months earlier.

Career
In 1978 he formed the band Nacha Pop out of another band, Uhu-Helicopter. In 1980, Nacha Pop released their debut album. The band broke up in 1988 and Antonio began a solo career.

Discography

Solo career 
 Studio Albums
1991 – No me iré mañana
1994 – Océano de sol
         Elixir de Juventud
         Vapor with Nacho Vejar
         Palabras
         Lleno de Papel
         Hablando de Ellos
         El Sitio de mi Recreo
         Ahora se que mis Amigos
         Cierto para Imaginar
         Palabras (Instrumental)
         Written and Arranged by Antonio
1998 – Anatomía de una ola
         La Hora del Precuspulo
         Como la Lluvia al Sol
         Tuve que Correr with Nacho Vejar
         Murmullo de tus Manos
         Tributo a ...
         Mi Hogar en Cualquier Sitio
         Angel Caido
         Agua de Rio with Nacho Vejar + Music by Basilio Marti
         Entre Tu y Yo
         Anatomia de Una Ola
         Written by Antonio and Arranged by Antonio, Basilio Marti and Joan Babiloni
2001 – De un lugar perdido
         Estaciones with Marga del Rio
         A Medio Camino
         Hojas que Arranque with Marga del Rio
         Para Bien y Para Mal
         Seda y Hierro
         De Un Lugar Perdido
         Ser un Chaval with Marga del Rio
         A Trabajos Forzados with Antonio Gala
         Horizons
         Written by Antonio
2005 – 3000 noches con Marga
 Live Albums
2002 – Básico (Madrid concert in El Círculo de Bellas Artes)
 Compilations
1992 – El sitio de mi recreo (Best ballads compilation)
1993 – Ese chico triste y solitario (Tribute by various artists)
2004 – Escapadas (Album of collaborations)

With Nacha Pop 
 Studio Albums
1980 – Nacha Pop
1982 – Buena disposición
1983 – Más números, otras letras
1984 – Una décima de segundo
1985 – Dibujos animados
1987 – El momento
 Live Albums
1988 – Nacha Pop 1980–1988 (Live Album)
2008 – Tour 80-08 Reiniciando (2 CDs + DVD. Live recording)

With Un Mar al Sur 
2008 – Un sueño compartido

With Marta Sánchez 
Marta Sánchez album De Par en Par
2010 – Escrito Sobre el Viento

References

1957 births
2009 deaths
Deaths from pneumonia in Spain
Singers from Madrid
Spanish pop singers
20th-century Spanish singers
20th-century Spanish male singers
Spanish male singers